Kamvounia is a former municipality in Kozani regional unit, West Macedonia, Greece. From 2011 to 2019 it was part of the municipality Servia-Velventos, of which it was a municipal unit. It is now a municipal unit of the municipality of Servia. The municipal unit has an area of 149.535 km2. The 2011 census recorded 1,539 residents in the municipal unit. The seat of the municipality was in Tranovalto.

References

Populated places in Kozani (regional unit)
Former municipalities in Western Macedonia